IS1, IS-1, or variation, may refer to:

IS1
IS1 may refer to:
 HMG Infosec Standard No.1, a computer security standard used in the UK
 The IBM IS1, an early relational database system

IS-1
IS-1 may stand for:
The Soviet tank IS-1 the first model of the Soviet Iosif Stalin tank series
The first model of the Soviet Istrebitel Sputnikov missile; see anti-satellite weapon
Nikitin IS-1, a retractable wing fighter aircraft

See also
 ISI (disambiguation)
 IS (disambiguation)